Jeremie is a given name and surname. Notable people with the name include:

Given name
Jeremie Berrebi (born 1978), French-Israeli entrepreneur and businessman
Jeremie Dufault, American politician
Jeremie Frimpong (born 2000), Dutch footballer
Jeremie Harris, American actor
Jeremie Miller, software developer

Surname
James Jeremie, literature and divinity professor
John Jeremie (1795–1841), British judge and diplomat

See also
Jérémie (given name)
Jeramie, given name
Jeremi, given name
Jeremy (given name)